Forewick Holm is a  island in the Sound of Papa in the Shetland islands, Scotland. Located between Papa Stour and the Sandness peninsula. Since 2008, it has also been referred to as Forvik Island as a result of Stuart "Captain Calamity" Hill's protest around constitutional matters.

Location

A small islet called Scarf's Head is accessible from Forewick Holm at low tide.

Name
The island is officially named Forewick Holm. Wick is an anglicisation of vik, a Norse and modern Norwegian word for a narrow bay. Får is sheep in modern Norwegian, Danish and Swedish. Holm is a common name in the Orkney and Shetland islands, and elsewhere, for a small, rounded island, an example is Stockholm.

History
There are no records of the island being permanently inhabited at any time, and in 2008, Stuart Hill was residing there for a few days a year.  Its small size renders it unable to support any significant population.  However, there is some evidence of a circular construction on its SSE tip, which could represent anything from a sheep pen to a Pictish era building.

The SS Highcliffe was wrecked on the islet on 6 February 1940. It was carrying a cargo of iron ore from Narvik, bound for Immingham.

Current ownership of the islet is in dispute between Papa Stour resident Mark King and Cunningsburgh resident Stuart Hill.  Hill is an Englishman who settled in Shetland after being shipwrecked there in 2001 during a failed attempt to circumnavigate the British Isles, earning him the nickname "Captain Calamity".   Hill claims that the island's udal title (allodial title) was donated to him in 2008 by the owner Mark King.  He claims to have a signed, witnessed document confirming this. King has stated this is not the case, but that he had agreed to sell the island to Hill. In March 2009, King still claimed ownership stating that Hill had not paid for the island as agreed.

Declaration of Dependence
On 21 June 2008, Hill unilaterally declared Forvik Island to be a British Crown Dependency, and thus not a part of the United Kingdom or of the European Union.  Initially the official name was the Crown Dependency of Forvik, although this was later changed to the Sovereign State of Forvik.  The name Forvik was coined by Hill. "Forvik" is not a recorded historical form, but a pseudo-Norse version of "Forewick", which is the name of a headland on the adjacent island of Papa Stour.

In 2008, there were no full-time residents or permanent structures on the island.  Hill announced his intention to erect a structure on the island, without planning permission.  He travelled to and from the island on a small flat-bottomed plywood home made boat; in September 2008, he had to be rescued by a Coastguard helicopter and RNLI Lifeboat after his vessel began to sink. His boat was described as "ramshackle" and a "floating wardrobe" and was criticised by his rescuers for having no lifejacket or radio aboard.

In July 2008 Hill announced that he was inviting companies to bid for oil exploration rights in Forvik's territorial waters.  He claimed what he was trying to do with Forvik is illustrate to Shetlanders what they could achieve if they asserted their legal rights and similarly seceded from the United Kingdom.  He is involved in other related secessionist activities in Shetland.

Constitutional arguments
Hill cited an arrangement struck in 1469 between King Christian I of Denmark/Norway and Scotland's King James III, whereby Christian effectively pawned the Shetland Islands to James in order to raise money for his daughter's dowry. He contended that, as the loan was never repaid and no other legal agreement ever put in place, Shetland remains in a constitutional limbo, and should properly enjoy the status of Crown Dependencies such as the Isle of Man or the Channel Islands. The validity of this was not accepted by the British government.

Other activities
Hill has sold "citizenships" for between £60 and £540: In 2008, he had sold around 100.  Membership conditions were later changed to £20 per annum, and in 2015, Hill claimed there were 218 members.

Hill has refused to pay road tax or insurance to the UK government, instead creating documents issued by Forvik. In 2011, he was found guilty of driving offences arising from this.

References

External links

 www.forvik.com: The 'official' Forvik project website.

Uninhabited islands of Shetland